Franz Xaver von Linsenmann (November 28, 1835 – September 21, 1898) was an important Catholic moral theologian and the Bishop of Rottenburg.

Born in Rottweil, Linsenmann was unanimously elected Bishop of Rottenburg on July 20, 1898, and was proclaimed on September 5. However, he died before his consecration during a curative stay in the Black Forest spa town of Lauterbach.

1835 births
1898 deaths
Roman Catholic bishops of Rottenburg
19th-century German Catholic theologians
19th-century German Roman Catholic bishops
Members of the Württembergian Chamber of Deputies
German male non-fiction writers
19th-century male writers